Yağda   is a village in Erdemli district of Mersin Province, Turkey. At , it is situated in the peneplain area of the Taurus Mountains. The population of Yağda was 393 as of 2012. The citrus forests around the village provide kindling and the village is named after kindling oil ( means oil in Turkish). The main economic activity is farming, and a variety of fruits and vegetables are produced.

References

Villages in Erdemli District